

By brand and manufacturer

A
 Accord (by Universal UTB)
 Acreage (built in China)
 AEC-Jinma (by Jinma)
 Afortek (by Dong Feng)
 Ag Pro (by Jinma)
 Ag-Boss  (by Jinma)
 AGCO  (by MTD, Same Deutz-Fahr, Iseki)
 AGCO-Allis  (by MTD, Same Deutz-Fahr, Iseki)
 Ag-King (by Jinma)
 Ag-Meier (reconditioned Kubota tractors)
 Ager
 AGRA (built in China)
 Agracat (by Jinma, LG/LS)
 Agrar Tec (by Foton)
 Agri boss  (from China)
 Agria  (by Carraro Agritalia)
 Agri Garden (by Weituo)
 Agrimex (from China)
 Agrindo  (from China)
 Agri-Power (by Fiat, Zetor)
 Agrison (by BOMR)
 Agro King (from China)
 Agro Master (by Foton)
 Agrobix (Jiangling/Fengshou)
 Agro Prince (from China)
 Agropro (from China)
 Agrostroj (by Wisconsin Engineering)
 Agrozet (by Wisconsin Engineering)
 Agtor (by Zetor)
 AgTraxx (by Jiangling/Fengshou)
 Aito (by Luzhong
 Alfrat  (by Mahindra and Uzel)
 Alliance (by TYM)
 Allied (USA)(by Benye)
 Allis-Chalmers (by Fiat, Hinomoto/Toyosha, Renault, Steiger)
 Allmand (by TYM)
 Alpine  (by Pasquali, AGT)
 Amar (from China)
 American (by NanYue)
 American Harvestor (from China)
 Amobil (by MTZ)
 Angad (by Shandong Shifeng)
 Anglo-Thai New Holland (by New Holland)
 Antonio Carraro (some by  Carraro (Agritalia))
 Aolida (from China)
 Apollo (by John Deere Tiantuo)
 Apollo (by Changfa)
 Ari (from China)
 ArmaTrac (Turkey)(by Erkunt Tractor Industry Inc.)
 Arslan Motor (by Jinma)
 ArTrac (by Dongfeng)
 Arvid  (by Dongfeng)
 Atlas  (from China)
 Avenger (by DongFangHong, DongFeng, Shenniu)
 Azteka (by Dongfeng)

B
 Badger (by TaiShan)
 Barbieri & Cia. (from China)
 Barchinkar - (Iran) (by DongFangHong/YTO)
 Basun (from China)
 Bautz-Nuffield (by Nuffield)
 BCS (by Goldoini)
 Bear  (by Dong Feng)
 Berkyns Track (from China)
 BGU (by TYM)
 Biltmore -by E.T. Rugg
 Bison  (by Shenniu)
 Bison (Hayco) (by Jinma)
 Bobcat [tractor line only] by Daedong/Kioti
 Bolens (by Iseki)
 Bolgar (by Belarus/MTZ)
 Bolton  (by Jinma)
 BONA (from China)
 BR Jinma (by Jinma)
 Brahorn  (from China)
 Branson  (by Kukje)
 Buck (by Dong Feng)
 Bulldog (by Dong Feng)

C
 Cabela's (by TYM)
 Cagri (from China)
 Camco (from China)
 Capri (by Shanghai)
 Case IH  (by Carraro Agritalia, Daedong, LS Tractors, Mitsubishi, Shibaura, Steyr, Turk Traktor)
 Catron  (by Carraro Agritalia)
 Century (by Kukje)
 Champ (by Benye)
 Challenger (by Carraro Agritalia, Iseki)
 Chery Green Bull (by Chery)
 CIHTAЙ (by XingTai)
 CINA (by Jinma)
 Claas (by Carraro Agritalia)
 Cmax (from China)
 Co-op Implements (by Cockshutt, Deutz-Fahr, Steiger, Roper, Volvo BM)
 Cockshutt (by Fiat, Oliver, Jacobsen)
 Colpron (by Landini)
 Cougar (from China)
 Coyote (from China)
 Cub Cadet  (by Mitsubishi, Daedong, Yanmar)

D
 D.Brown -(Germany)(by YTO/DongFangHong)
 Damask (by Jinma)
 DanCat (by Benye)
 Darvana (by Jinma)
 Daxtrac  (by DongFeng)
 Defiant - (Russia)
 Deleks (by Dongfeng)
 Deljen (by Jinma)
 Devonn (by Dongfeng)
 Dewan (by Shanghai and Dongfeng)
 Dewan Euro Leopard (by Foton)
 Deutz-Allis (by Hinomoto, Same Deutz-Fahr)
 Dexing (by Enfly)
 Diesel Ox (by Shenniu)
 DIPASA (from China)
 Ditai (from China)
 Divorale (by Foton)
 DLY Dragon (from China)
 Dongfeng Bemaq (by Dongfeng)
 Double-R (by TYM)
 Dragman (from China)
 Dragon (from China)
 DTZ (from China)
 DW (by Foton)

E
 Eagle (by DongFeng, Foton, Kama, Shenniu)
 EAMCO (by Rakovica (IMR))
 East Wind  (by Dong Feng)
 Eclipse (from China)
 Ecopard (by Jinma & BCS/Ferrari)
 Eicher (by Carraro Agritalia)
 Emerald (from China)
 Emerybuilt  (by Jinma)
 ERKUNT (Turkey)(by Erkunt Tractor Industry Inc.)
 Euro (by Foton)
 Euro Drive (from China)
 EuroFord  (by HEMA)
 EuroLeopard (by Foton)
 Europard (by Foton)
 Europars - (Iran)(by Foton)
 Eurostar (by Foton)
 EuroTechnika (by Jinma)
 Eurotrac (by Foton)
 Eurotrac YTO (by YTO)
 Eurotrack (from China)
 Eurotrak (by Foton)
 EuroWolf (by Foton)
 Evangel (from China)

F
 Farm (by Dongfeng)
 Farm Boss (by Jinma)
 Farm Champ (by Jinma)
 Farm-Kits (from China)
 Farm Master (by Jinma)
 Farm Pro (by Foton, Jinma)
 Farm Ranger (from China)
 Farm System (by FengShou/Jiangling)
 Farm Tanakaya  (by DaeDong)
 Farmer (by Wisconsin Engineering)
 Farmliner  (by Universal UTB)
 Farmliner Daedong (by Daedong)
 FarmTrac  (by LG/LS, Same Deutz-Fahr)
 Farmtrack (Argentina)
 Farmwell (by Massey Ferguson)
 Fecto Belarus  (by MTZ/Belarus)
 Ferrari (by Goldoni)
 Fiat (by Al-Ghazi, Shibaura, Turk-Fiat, Versatile)
 Foison (from China)
 Ford (by Daedong, Fiat, Hinomoto, Jacobsen, Same Deutz-Fahr, Steiger, Waltanna)
 Fortier (by Jinma)
 Foton Europard (by Foton)
 Foton Pol-Mot  (by Foton)
 Foxy (by Hutian)
 Frontier (by Jinma, Foton)
 Fubang (from China)
 Fumetsu (Luzhong and BOMR)

G
 GM (from China)
 GP (from China)
 Gold Horse (by Jinma)
 Goldbull (by Foton, DongFangHong, Jinma)
 Goliath (by AGT)
 Green Bull (by Chery & KAT)
 Green Horse (by Jinma)
 Green Land (by Jinma, Foton, KAT and YTO)
 Green Lander (by Jinma)
 Griffin (by Kama)
 Grissly (from China)
 Guangda (from China)
 Guoxin (from China)
 Gutbrod (by Bungartz, Goldini)

H
 Hanomag (Dowel)(Argentina) (by Foton)
 Hanwo (from China)
 Hanyuan (from China)
 HardLand (by DongFangHong)
 Hardy (by Jiangsu)
 HartFord (from China and Europe)
 Harvest (by FengShou/Jiangling)
 Hengan (from China)
 Hercules (from China)
 Hobby Horse (by Shenniu)
 Hud-son (by China)

I
 IMA Genesis (by YTO)
 Impact (from China)
 Indotrak by Zhongtuo
 Internacional (by HTZ)
 International Harvester (by Acremaster, KTMCO, Mistusbishi, MRS, Steiger)
 Interstar (by Foton)
 Iron  (by Foton)
 Iron Horse  (by Jinma)
 Iseki  (by Massey Ferguson/AGCO, Landini)
 Isoto (by Tuber)
 Ital (from China)
 ITC (from China & Tong Yang Moolsan)
 ITM (Iran Tractor Manufacturing Company)
 IZUKY (by Jinma)

J
 Janisch Ursus (by Ursus)
 Janma (Jinma)
 JBT (from China)
 Jepe (by Jinma, Foton)
 Jiang Dong (from China)
 John Deere (by Carraro Agritalia, Goldoni, Kukje, Wagner, Yanmar, Zetor)
 John Mersson (by Dongfeng and others)
 Johnson (by Foton, others)
 Joshua Howard (Foton, Jinma, Shanghai, Shenniu)
 Junyu (from China)

K
 Kaan (from China)
 KAMCO (by Barbieri)
 Kellfri  (by Foton)
 Kilworth  (by BCS)
 Kínai (from China)
 King (Tianjin, TaiShan, Foton)
 Kingship (from China)
 Kinta (by Enfly)
 Kioti (by Daedong)
 Kodiak (from China)
 Komodo (by Foton)
 KSF (by BOMR)
 Kumiai (by Mitsubishi)
 Kunow (by FengShou/Jiangling)
 Kubota

L
 Lakota (from China)
 Landini  (by Massey Ferguson, LS, Buhler)
 LandLegend (by Dong Feng)
 Landmark (from China)
 Landpower (by Daedong)
 LandTrac (by Mitsubishi)
 Land Track (by YTO)
 Langpu (by Weituo, Xingtai, Luzhong tractor and others)
 Leda (by LTZ)
 Ledinegg  (by BCS/Ferrari)
 Lenar  (by Jiangling, LS)
 LFIAT (LFKeDi)(from China)
 LGMG (from China)
 Liady (by Weifang)
 Liberty (by Jinma)
 Lic Fiat (by DongFangHong)
 Lindner (by Steyr)
 LGW - (Hungary) (by Dong Feng)
 LKD (by Foton, others)
 Lobbo (by Foton)
 Logus  (by Foton)
 Longmen Warrior (by DongFangHong)
 Long (by Universal UTB, Landini)
 LongTrac (by Universal UTB)
 Lyntrac (by Jinma)

M
 M&M Eagle Tractor Pro (from China)
 Mahindra (by Mitsubishi, TYM)
 Malves (by Ursus)
 Maoyuan (from China)
 Marina (by Dongfeng)
 MAS (by Kama)
 Massey Ferguson  (by Carraro Agritalia, Ebro, Eicher, Hinomoto/Toyosha, Iseki, IMT, ITMCo, Landini, McConnell Tractors, Millat, MTD, Same Deutz-Fahr, Simplicity, Tafe, Ursus, Uzel)
 Maverick (Argentina) (by Foton)
 Maverick (USA) (by Weifang)
 McCormick International  (by LS, Landini, SEP)
 McConnell-Marc  (by Jiangsu, Jinma)
 McKee Ebro (by Ebro)
 Merlin (from China)
 Midi-Trac (by Jiangling)
 Millennium (by TYM)
 Mingsin
 Minneapolis-Moline (by Fiat)
 Minot (by Jinma)
 MKS (by Jinma)
 Montana (LG Montana)(by LG/LS, Kukje, Escorts, Sonalika, Universal UTB, TYM)
 Montana LS (by LS Tractors)
 Montana Solis (by Landini and Solis)
 Monza (by Foton, Jinma)
 Morgan (by Kama)
 Mountaineer (by TaiShan)
 M.S.M. Tractor (by Jinma?)
 MTE by Jinma)

N
 Nagano (by Mitsubishi and from China)
 Nallahay (by TaiShan)
 Nebula (by Dongfeng)
 Nellie Belle (by Jinma)
 New Holland  (by Al-Ghazi, Buhler Versatile, Iseki, Landini, LS, Shanghai, Shibaura, Turk Traktor)
 Nibbi (by TYM)
 Noriker  (by DongFeng)
 North Land (by Shenniu)
 NorTrac  (by Belarus/MTZ, Jinma)

O
 OberTech (by Dongfeng)
 Ohfu (from China)
 Oliver (by David Brown Ltd., Fiat, Jacobsen, Same Deutz-Fahr)
 Onj  (by Jinma)

P
 Panda (from China)
 Pasquali (by Goldoni)
 Pengrun (from China)
 Percheron  (by Dongfeng)
 Power Chief (by Jiangling)
 Pioneer (from China)
 Polarprod (by Jinma)
 Potent (from China)
 Power-Trac (by Yagmur)
 Power Track (from China)
 Pronar  (by MTZ, ZTS, LTZ)
 Protech (from China)

Q
 QNP (from China)

R
 RabTrak (by YTO)
 Ransomes (by Shibaura)
 Raphael (from China)
 Rebel (by Jinma)
 Red Star (by Shanghai)
 Renault (by Allis-Chalmers, Agritalia, Antonio Carraro, Carraro Agritalia, PGS, Porsche)
 Renoman (f
 RH  (by Jinma)
 Rhino International (by Yancheng Tractor-Jinma, Shanghai, Feng Shou/Jiangling, Tianjin Tractor-Tieniu, Benye, Guilin Crawler, Harbin, Changchun, DFH-YTO)
 Riata (by Jinma)
 Ringo  (from China)
 RM-5 (by Gilson Brothers Inc.)-(a.k.a."Gilson"\located in Canada)
 RMT (by Jinma)
 Roland H  (by Jinma)
 Romer (by Jinma)
 RunYuan (from China)

S
 Samson (by Jinma)
 SamTrac (from China)
 Sartrac (by Benye, Jinma, Foton)
 Scorpion - (USA)(by TYM)
 SCS (by YTO)
 Sepahan - (Iran) (by Luzhong)
 SFR (by YTO)
 Shallwin (from China)
 Shamrock (by Jinma)
 Shuangwei (from China)
 Sierra (by Yangcheng)
 Silon (from China)
 Silverscore (from China)
 SilverStar (by Shanghai/Shenniu)
 Silverstone (by Fengshou/Jiangling)
 Simplicity (by Hinomoto/Toyosha)
 SinoGallop (from China)
 Siromer (by Jinma, LG/LS)
 Smith (by Jinma)
 Someca (by Dongfeng)
 Sonic (from China?)
 Sparber (Foton, Jinma, Shanghai, Shenniu)
 Sport Diesel (by Jinma)
 SRD (by Benye, Foton)
 Stallion (by Jinma)
 Staunch (by Indo Farm)
 S-Tec (by Shanghai)
 Steyr  (by Basak, Massey Ferguson, Valmet)
 Stockman  (by Jinma and Foton)
 Strong (from China)
 Stud  (by DongFeng)
 Sunco (from China)
 Supershan (by Taishan)

T
 TAC  (by Jinma)
 Tafe  (by LG/LS)
 Taima Power Trac (from China)
 Talaythong (from Dongfeng)
 Talon  (by Dongfeng)
 Tangent (by Jinma)
 TAS (by Carraro Agritalia)
 Task Master  (by FengShou, Jiangling, Jinma, Shenniu and others)
 TEAK (by Kat and others)
 TEKIMA (from China)
 Teknik Makina (by DongFangHong, Foton)
 TeRaW (by Jinma)
 Terra Trac (by Foton)
 Terra-Cyclone (by FengShou, Foton, Jiangling)
 Terraplane (by DongFeng, Foton, Jiangling)
 Terra Power (by Universal UTB)
 Terra Tec (from China)
 Terrion (by Kirovets)
 Tex Trac (by Jinma)
 Texmaco
 Tiger (from China)
 Tiger (Ranger) (by Yanmar)
 TigerTrac (by FengShou)
 Tirsam (by TaiShan)
 TM Trac (by Fengshou/Jiangling
 TNG (by Foton, Jinma)
 TOB HBN (by Xing
 Toos  (by MTZ, LTZ)
 TOP  (by Jinma)
 Topall (from China)
 Toyama (by Jinma)
 Tracco (by Jiangling and Jinma)
 Tracmaster (from China)
 Tractor King (by Jinma, Foton)
 TraktorImport.se (by Dongfeng)
 Tratoretto (from China)
 Tramontini  (by Dongfeng)
 TSC Huskee (from China)
 TTC  (by Jinma)
 TUR (by Ursus)
 Turf Boss (by Jinma)
 Turf Champ (by Jinma)
 Turk Fiat Ferrari (by Ferrar
 Tytan (by Weifang)

U
 UM Taishan (by TaiShan)
 United (By Allis-Chalmers)
 Uplion (from China)

V
 Valmet (by Carraro Agritalia, Massey Ferguson)
 Valpadana  (by Yagmur)
 Valtec (by Hattat, MAT, Pauny Zanello)
 Valtra  (by Carraro Agritalia, LS)
 Valtra Eicher (Dutch importer)(by Carraro Agritalia)
 Valtra-Valmet (by Carraro Agritalia)
 Vari (by Jinma)
 VBA (from China)
 Vemac (by Jinagling and YTO)
 Vmax (from China)
 Vollerup Trac2r (by FengShou)
 Vovo (by Weifang)
 VST Tillers (by Mitsubishi, Eurotrac)

W
 W&P  (by Luzhong and Kama)
 Walter Barrett (by FengShou)
 Wheel Ox (from China)
 Whirlston (from China)
 White (by Fiat, Iseki, Same Deutz-Fahr)
 Wingin (from China)
 Wonderful (from China)
 Woodland (by Jinma)
 Woody (from China)
 WorkHorse (by Jinma)
 Worktrac (from China)
 WorkTrak  (by Foton, Jinma)
 Wuzing (by Foton, others)

X
 XG Power (by Jinma)
 Xiaer (from China)
 Xuebao (from China)

Y
 Yukon (Wisconsin Engineering )
 Yagmur (by Carraro (Agritalia))
 Yangcheng (by  Sierra)
 
 YTO (by YTO)

Z
 Zahow (by Wisconsin Engineering)
 Zainab Bangura (from China)
 Zebra (by HMT)
 Zen-Noh (by Kubota, Mitshubishi, Yanmar)
 Zetor (by Kukje, Wisconsin Engineering, ZTS)
 Zongtuo (by Indotrak)
 Zubr (by Jinma and XingTai)
 Zymac (from China)

Other
Булат (by Dongfeng)

Tractors